P/2016 G1 (PanSTARRS) was a main-belt asteroid that was destroyed by an impact event on 6 March 2016. It was discovered by Robert Weryk and Richard Wainscoat of the Pan-STARRS 1 survey at Haleakala Observatory. The object was initially thought to be Encke-type comet because of its diffuse appearance, so it received the periodic comet designation P/2016 G1. After further analysis, what had initially appeared to be a comet's halo turned out to be rubble from a collision. The asteroid had completely disintegrated by 2017.

Astronomers were able to use the asteroid's rubble to determine the date of the collision, since the dispersion of dust was inversely proportional to its size.

See also 
 354P/LINEAR
 493 Griseldis
 596 Scheila

References

External links 
 P/2016 G1 (PANSTARRS), Minor Planet Center
 Images of P/2016 G1, Luc Arnold

Cometary object articles

Encke-type comets
Destroyed comets

Discoveries by Pan-STARRS
Small-asteroids collision
Comets in 2016
20130401